The Trialeti-Vanadzor culture, previously known as the Trialeti-Kirovakan culture, is named after the Trialeti region of Georgia and the city of Vanadzor, Armenia. It is attributed to the late 3rd and early 2nd millennium BC. Trialeti-Vanadzor culture emerged in the areas of the preceding Kura-Araxes culture. Some scholars speculate that it was an Indo-European culture. It developed into the Lchashen-Metsamor culture. It may have also given rise to the Hayasa-Azzi confederation mentioned in Hittite texts, and the Mushki mentioned by the Assyrians.

Background
The earliest Shulaveri-Shomu culture existed in the area from 6000 to 4000 BC. The Kura-Araxes culture followed after.

The flourishing stage of the Trialeti-Vanadzor culture began near the end of the third millennium BC.

During the final phase of the Middle Bronze Age (c.1700–1500 BC), in addition to the Trialeti-Vanadzor period culture, three other geographically overlapping material culture horizons predominate in the South Caucasus (Transcaucasia) and eastern Anatolia: Karmir Berd (a.k.a. Tazakend), Karmir Vank (a.k.a. Kizil Vank, Van-Urmia), and Sevan-Uzerlik (a.k.a. Sevan-Artsakh).

Black-burnished and monochrome painted wares vessels from the cemeteries of Ani and Küçük Çatma (Maly Pergit), both in the Kars Province of Turkey, and :tr:Sos Höyük IV in Erzurum Province resemble those of Trialeti.

Kurgans
At that time, there was already strong social differentiation indicated by rich mound burials. There are parallels to the Early Kurgan culture. Cremation was practised. Painted pottery was introduced. Tin-based bronze became predominant. Geographical interconnectedness and links with other areas of the Near East are seen in many aspects of the culture. For example, a cauldron found in Trialeti is nearly identical to the one from Shaft Grave 4 of Mycenae in Greece.

The Trialeti-Vanadzor culture shows ties with the highly developed cultures of the ancient world, particularly with the Aegean, but also with cultures to the south and east.

Trialeti-Vanadzor painted monochrome and polychrome pottery is very similar to that in the other areas of the Near East. In particular, similar ceramics are known as Urmia ware (named after Lake Urmia in Iran). Also, similar pottery was produced by the Sevan-Uzerlik culture, and the Karmir Berd-Sevan culture.

The site at Trialeti was originally excavated in 1936–1940 in advance of a hydroelectric scheme, when forty-six barrows were uncovered. A further six barrows were uncovered in 1959–1962.

Related kurgans
Martqopi kurgans are somewhat similar, and are contemporary to the earliest among the Trialeti kurgans. Together, they represent the early stage of the Early Kurgan culture of Central Transcaucasia.

This Early Kurgan period, known as Martkopi-Bedeni, has been interpreted as a transitional phase and the first stage of the Middle Bronze Age.

Burial practices
The Trialeti-Vanadzor culture was known for its particular form of burial. The elite were interred in large, very rich burials under earth and stone mounds, which sometimes contained four-wheeled carts. Also there were many gold objects found in the graves. These gold objects were similar to those found in Iran and Iraq. They also worked tin and arsenic. This form of burial in a tumulus or "kurgan", along with wheeled vehicles, is the same as that of the Kurgan culture which has been associated with the speakers of Proto-Indo-European. In fact, the black burnished pottery of especially early Trialeti kurgans is similar to Kura-Araxes pottery. In a historical context, their impressive accumulation of wealth in burial kurgans, like that of other associated and nearby cultures with similar burial practices, is particularly noteworthy. This practice was probably a result of influence from the older civilizations to the south in the Fertile Crescent.

The Trialeti-Vanadzor pottery style is believed to have developed into the Late Bronze Age Transcaucasian ceramic ware found throughout much of what is now eastern Turkey. This pottery has been connected to the expansion of the Mushki.

See also 
Kura-Araxes culture
Lchashen-Metsamor culture
Shulaveri-Shomu culture
Prehistoric Georgia
Prehistoric Armenia

References

External links
Middle Bronze Age, Trialeti Culture, South Caucasus - collection of articles at academia.edu

Archaeological cultures of West Asia
Bronze Age cultures of Asia
Archaeological cultures in Armenia
Archaeological cultures in Georgia (country)
Prehistoric sites in Georgia (country)
Prehistoric Georgia (country)
Indo-European archaeological cultures